Henry Ratu Wainiu Seniloli (born 15 June 1989) is a Fijian rugby union player who currently plays as a Scrum-half for Benetton Treviso.
He made his debut for Fiji against Romania on 23 November 2013.

References

1989 births
Living people
People from Tavua, Fiji
Fijian rugby union players
Fiji international rugby union players
Benetton Rugby players
Rugby union scrum-halves
I-Taukei Fijian people
People educated at Ratu Kadavulevu School
People educated at Suva Grammar School